On 4 May 2014 around 4:17pm (EDT) a daylight bolide occurred near Ontario, resulting in a meteor air burst. The explosion was estimated to be equivalent to approximately 10–20 tons of TNT. The meteor was first seen in Peterborough and traveled on a southwest-to-northeast trajectory. A meteor of this size impacts Earth about twice a week.

The meteor was large enough that it may have generated meteorites. A strewn field has not yet been located but would be downstream after dark flight. Weather radar returns suggest that the meteorite(s) may have landed near Codrington.

References

External links 
Streaking fireball, loud blast may have been meteor
Bright daytime meteor seen over Canada and U.S. Northeast

Explosions in 2014
2014 in space
2014 Ontario fireball
Meteoroids
2014 in Ontario
20140504
May 2014 events in Canada